Petar Pavlović (Serbian Cyrillic: Петар Павловић; born 3 March 1987) is a Serbian footballer who plays for FK Bežanija in the Serbian First League.

External links
 
 Petar Pavlović stats at utakmica.rs 
 

1987 births
Living people
Serbian footballers
FK Radnički 1923 players
FK Metalac Gornji Milanovac players
FK Novi Pazar players
FK Bežanija players
Serbian SuperLiga players
Serbian First League players
Serbian expatriate footballers
Serbian expatriate sportspeople in Greece
Expatriate footballers in Greece
Association football defenders
People from Raška, Serbia